Zavodoukovsk is a town in Tyumen Oblast, Russia, located on the Bolshoy Uk River (an arm of the Tobol)  southeast of Tyumen, the administrative center of the oblast. As of the 2010 Census, its population was 25,647.

History
It was founded in 1729 as a village of Ukovskaya. In 1787, it was renamed Zavodoukovskoye. It was granted urban-type settlement status in 1941 and town status in 1960.

Administrative and municipal status
Within the framework of administrative divisions, Zavodoukovsk serves as the administrative center of Zavodoukovsky District, even though it is not a part of it. As an administrative division, it is incorporated separately as the Town of Zavodoukovsk—an administrative unit with a status equal to that of the districts. As a municipal division, the territories of the Town of Zavodoukovsk and of Zavodoukovsky District are incorporated as Zavodoukovsky Urban Okrug.

References

Notes

Sources

Cities and towns in Tyumen Oblast
Populated places established in 1729
1729 establishments in the Russian Empire